The 1988–89 season was FC Dinamo București's 40th season in Divizia A. After a couple of seasons in the European competitions without remarkable results, Dinamo qualified in the quarterfinals of the Cup Winners' Cup. Their opponents were Sampdoria Genoa, an Italian squad. The two games ended with draws, but Sampdoria moved forward due to an away goal. In the internal competitions, Dinamo could not interrupt Steaua's dominance, ending the championship in second place and losing the Romanian Cup final. Dorin Mateuţ won the European Golden Boot with 43 goals that were scored in the championship game.

Results

Romanian Cup final

Cup Winners' Cup 
First round

Dinamo București won 6–0 on aggregate

Second round

Dinamo București won 2–1 on aggregate

Quarterfinals

Sampdoria Genova București won 1–1 on aggregate due to away goal

Squad 
Goalkeepers: Dumitru Moraru, Bogdan Stelea, Sorin Colceag.

Defenders: Iulian Mihăescu, Ioan Andone, Mircea Rednic, Michael Klein, Adrian Matei, Alexandru Nicolae, Ioan Varga, Bogdan Bucur, Adrian Nicoară.

Midfielders: Ionuț Lupescu, Dănuț Lupu, Dorin Mateuț, Costel Orac, Ioan Ovidiu Sabău, Marcel Sabou, Gheorghe Viscreanu, Daniel Sava, Mihai Stoica.

Forwards: Rodion Cămătaru, Claudiu Vaișcovici, Florin Răducioiu, Romeo Dochia, George Timiș.

Transfers 
Dinamo brought Gheorghe Viscreanu from Flacăra Moreni and Ioan Ovidiu Sabău from ASA Târgu Mureș. In the winter break Dinamo brought Michael Klein from Corvinul Hunedoara and Adrian Matei from Rapid. Florin Prunea is loaned to U.Cluj.

References 
 www.labtof.ro
 www.romaniansoccer.ro

FC Dinamo București seasons
Dinamo Bucuresti